Arnold's may refer to:

Arnold's Cove, Canadian town in Newfoundland
Arnold's Cove Station, Newfoundland and Labrador
Arnold's cat map, chaotic map from the torus into itself
Arnold's giant tortoise
Arnold's Wrecking Co. 1973 film
Arnold's Drive-In, a setting on the sitcom Happy Days

See also
Arnold